John Wilkinson (February 11, 1868 – June 25, 1951) was born in Syracuse, New York. He invented the air-cooled motor which was used in the Franklin (automobile) produced by H. H. Franklin Manufacturing Company where he was chief engineer and designer from 1902 to 1924.

He was a native of Syracuse and a member of an established, respected, wealthy family. His grandfather, John Wilkinson (1798–1862), was one of the original pioneers of Upstate, New York.  As a young man, Wilkinson, Sr. was a city planner and named the newly incorporated village, Syracuse.

References

External links 
 The H. H. Franklin Club

1868 births
1951 deaths
People from Syracuse, New York
Cornell University College of Engineering alumni
Burials at Oakwood Cemetery (Syracuse, New York)
American automotive engineers
Engineers from New York (state)